The 1990 Champ Car season may refer to:
 the 1989–90 USAC Championship Car season, which was just one race, the 74th Indianapolis 500
 the 1990 CART PPG Indy Car World Series, sanctioned by CART, who later became Champ Car